Kundryak (Künderäk) is a rural locality (a selo) and the administrative centre of Kundryaksky Selsoviet, Sterlibashevsky District, Bashkortostan, Russia. The population was 321 as of 2010. There are 5 streets.

Geography 
Kundryak is located 25 km southeast of Sterlibashevo (the district's administrative centre) by road. Rayevka is the nearest rural locality.

References 

Rural localities in Sterlibashevsky District